Hollywood Treasure is an American reality television series that began airing on SyFy, October 27, 2010, which follows a Hollywood, California-based appraiser named Joe Maddalena and his team as they track down, appraise and help auction off valuable film, television, and pop culture memorabilia.

Opening

Cast
 Joe Maddalena – "Treasure Hunter", Host/Owner of Profiles In History
 Brian Chanes – Head of Acquisitions/Consignment Relations
 Jon Mankuta – Special Projects Manager
 Tracey McCall – Client Relations/Special Events Coordinator
 Jesse D'Angelo – Prop Maker/Specialist
 Cherry Davis – Receptionist
 Stacey Roman – Auctioneer

Critical reception
David Hinckley of the New York Daily News wrote "Hollywood Treasure will intrigue film junkies and memorabilia collectors. For the rest of us, it's breezy amusement about a world that, like the movies themselves, we will always be watching from the audience".

Brian Lowry of Variety wrote that "we've seen this movie (or rather, reality-TV show) before, dozens of times, in more glamorous settings. And having each half-hour (two will air back to back) conclude with an auction doesn't really foster much suspense".

Patty Miranda of Shakefire.com wrote "For those who wish there was a Hollywood-themed version of American Pickers, Hollywood Treasure scratches that itch as it returns for a second season".

Episodes

Season one (2010–11)

Season two (2012)

References

External links

Syfy original programming
2010s American reality television series
2010 American television series debuts
Auction television series
2012 American television series endings